Midh Ranjha (Punjabi, Urdu 'مڈھ رانجھا' ) is a village located in Tehsil Kot Momin District Sargodha of Pakistan. It is famous for Pakistan's biggest tree and is associated with the legendary Heer Ranjha story of romantic love. Heer originated in this village.

Nearby villages
Midh Ranjha is considered as a central point for several villages including Mohriwal, Abal, Dulewala, Badar Ranjha, Kot Ghazi and Thati Kalan.

Education
Schools of Midh Ranjha:

 Allied School Midh Ranjha Campus
 Arqam Grammar School
 Arqam Inter College
 Crescents School
 Govt. Higher Secondary School Boys & Girls
 Govt Primary School Boys & Girls
 Knowledge City School

Biggest Banyan Tree of Pakistan
It is situated on the banks of the Chenab river near Abhal-Mohri village,  from Midh Ranjha. The tree is at least 400 years old, and there is a tradition that it was planted over 600 years ago by Sufi Murtaza Shah with his disciple Baba Roday Shah. The grave of Sufi Murtaza Shah is under the tree. There is a local belief that harm will come to anyone who damages the tree. Many different species of birds have their nests in its branches.

Botanical classification
Botanically known as Ficus benghalensis, and belonging to the family Moraceae, the banyan tree is a native of south Asia. The fruit is like a small fig and is eaten by some people. It tastes sweeter than fig. The banyan plant is seen sometimes growing from the little wet dust deposits on buildings because birds carry them around for eating. The fruit is red and when ripe gets softer.

See also
The Great Banyan India
List of individual trees
Sahabi Tree

References

Punjab, Pakistan
Sargodha District
Forests of Pakistan
Oldest trees
Individual trees